Mikołajew may refer to the following places:
Mikołajew, Łęczyca County in Łódź Voivodeship (central Poland)
Mikołajew, Zgierz County in Łódź Voivodeship (central Poland)
Mikołajew, Podlaskie Voivodeship (north-east Poland)
Mikołajew, Masovian Voivodeship (east-central Poland)